One More Day may refer to:

Music 
 One More Day (album), a 2001 album by Diamond Rio
 "One More Day" (Diamond Rio song), a 2000 song
 "One More Day" (Chocolat song), 2012
 "One More Day" (Eldrine song), 2011
 "One More Day" (New Edition song), 1997
 One More Day, a 2003 EP by Stephen Speaks
 "One More Day", a song by Rocket Club
 "One More Day", a song by Stellar* from Magic Line
 "One More Day", a song from the 1957 film Jailhouse Rock
 "One More Day", a song by 10 Years from Feeding the Wolves
 "One More Day", a song by Sistar featuring Giorgio Moroder
 "One More Day (Stay with Me)", a 2014 song by Example from the album Live Life Living
 "One More Day (Rock and Roll Me Over)", a traditional river or sea shanty
 "One More Day", a song by Ava (Éabha McMahon)
 "One More Day", a song by Mushroomhead from XIII
 "One More Day", a song by Sentenced from Crimson
 "One More Day", a song by We Came as Romans from Darkbloom

Other media 
 "One More Day" (Blue Heelers), an episode of Blue Heelers
 Spider-Man: One More Day, a 2007 Marvel Comics story arc

See also 
 For One More Day, a 2006 novel by Mitch Albom
 Oprah Winfrey Presents: Mitch Albom's For One More Day, a 2007 television film adaptation of Albom's novel